Tyler Whitesides is an American writer. He is the author of the middle grade fantasy series Janitors. The series is published by Shadow Mountain Publishing.

Bibliography
Janitors series
Janitors (September 2011)
Secrets of New Forest Academy (September 2012)
Curse of the Broomstaff (September 2013)
Strike of the Sweepers (September 2014)
Heroes of the Dustbin (September 2015)
Wishmakers series
The Wishmakers (February 2018)
The Wishbreaker (January 2019)
Ardor Benn series
The Thousand Deaths of Ardor Benn (May 2018)
The Shattered Realm of Ardor Benn (November 2020)
The Last Lies of Ardor Benn (December 2020)

External links 
 Official Website

References

21st-century American novelists
American fantasy writers
American male novelists
Novelists from Utah
Living people
21st-century American male writers
1987 births